Indigenous education specifically focuses on teaching Indigenous knowledge, models, methods, and content within formal or non-formal educational systems. The growing recognition and use of Indigenous education methods can be a response to the erosion and loss of Indigenous knowledge through the processes of colonialism, globalization, and modernity.

Cultural context of Indigenous learning in the Americas

A growing body of scientific literature has described Indigenous ways of learning, in different cultures and countries. Learning in Indigenous communities is a process that
involves all members in the community.

The learning styles that children use in their Indigenous schooling are the same ones that occur in their community context. These Indigenous learning styles often include: observation, imitation, use of narrative/storytelling, collaboration, and cooperation, as seen among American Indian, Alaska Native and Latin American communities. This is a hands on approach that emphasizes direct experience and learning through inclusion.The child feels that they are a vital member of the community, and they are encouraged to participate in a meaningful way by community members. Children often effectively learn skills through this system, without being taught explicitly or in a formal manner. This differs from Western learning styles, which tend to include methods such as explicit instruction in which a figure of authority directs the learner's attention, and testing/ quizzing. Creating an educational environment for Indigenous children that is consistent with upbringing, rather than an education that follows a traditionally Western format, allows for a child to retain knowledge more easily, because they are learning in a way that was encouraged from infancy within their family and community.

Robinson further said that traditional Western methods of education generally disregard the importance Indigenous cultures and environmental contributions, which results in a lack of relevance for students of aboriginal backgrounds. Modern schools have a tendency to teach skills stripped of context which has a detrimental impact on Indigenous students because they thrive off educational environments in which their cultures and languages are respected and infused in learning. Various aspects of Indigenous culture need to be considered when discussing Indigenous learning, such as: content (how culture is portrayed in text and through language), social culture/ interactions (relations between class interactions and interactions within Indigenous communities), and cognitive culture (differences in worldview, spiritual understandings, practical knowledge, etc.).

Classroom structure
According to Akhenoba Robinson(2019), The structure of Indigenous American classrooms that reflect the organization of Indigenous communities eliminates the distinction between the community and classroom and makes it easier for the students to relate to the material. Effective classrooms modeled off of the social structure of Indigenous communities are typically focused on group or cooperative learning that provide an inclusive environment. Between traditional Aboriginal education and the western system of education. A key factor for successful Indigenous education practices is the student-teacher relationship. Classrooms are socially constructed in a way that the teacher shares the control of the classroom with the students. Rather than taking an authoritative role, the teacher is viewed as a co-learner to the students, and they maintain a balance between personal warmth and demand for academic achievement.community in Mexico, teachers have been observed to let their students move freely about the classroom while working in order to consult with other students, as well as using their instructors for occasional guidance.

Teachers in Indigenous classrooms in a community in Alaska rely on group work, encourage the students to watch each other as a way to learn, and avoid singling out students for praise, criticism, or recitation. Praise, by Western standards, is minimal in Indigenous classrooms, and when it is given it is for effort, not for providing a correct answer to a question. Classroom discourse in Indigenous classrooms is an example of how the teacher shares control with the students. Observations in the Yup'ik and Mazahua communities show that Indigenous teachers are less likely to solicit an answer from an individual student, but rather encourage all of the students to participate in classroom discourse.  In the Yup'ik classroom direct questions are posed to the group as whole, and the control of talk is not the sole responsibility of the teacher. Classrooms in Indigenous communities that incorporate Indigenous ways of learning utilize open-ended questioning, inductive/analytical reasoning, and student participation and verbalization, in group settings.

Escuela Unitaria (one-room one-teacher)
Robinson A.(2019)he opined that, Escuela Unitaria is a one-room one-teacher style of schooling that is used in some rural communities, which utilizes ways of learning common in some Indigenous or Indigenous-heritage communities in the Americas. The school serves up to six grades in a single classroom setting with smaller groups (divided by grade level) in the classroom. Community involvement is strongly implemented in the management of the school. Learning activities are not just inside the classroom but also outside in the agricultural environment. Children are self-instructed and the content involves the students' rural community and family participation. The school is structured to meet cultural needs and match available resources. This classroom setting allows for a collaborative learning environment that includes the teacher, the students, and the community. Integration of cultural knowledge within the curriculum allows students to participate actively and to have a say in the responsibilities for classroom activities.

Spirituality

Indigenous students make meaning of what they learn through spirituality. Spirituality in learning involves students making connections between morals, values and intellect rather than simply acquiring knowledge. Knowledge to Indigenous people is personal and involves emotions, culture, traditional skills, nature, etc. For this reason, Indigenous students need time to make connections in class, and often benefit from a safe and respectful environment that encourages discussions among students.

Gilliard and Moore (2007) presented the experiences of eight Native American educators, focusing on the impact of having family and community culture included in the curriculum. Typically, tribal K-12 schools on the reservation have majority European American teachers. This study differs in that sense by studying educators who are all of Native American background and their interactions with students and families. These educators reported that their interactions with families stem from respect and understanding. There were three categories that surfaced when understanding and defining culture; (1) respect of children, families, and community, (2) building a sense of belonging and community through ritual, and (3) the importance of family values and beliefs.

 Respect of children, families, and community; educators approached interactions in a reflective and respectful way when talking with children, families, and the community. Educators accepted practices concerning death in individual families. Educators made it a point to be aware of curricular activities that may offend certain tribes. Lastly, educators spoke in a soft, quiet, and gentle way to the children.
 Building a sense of belongingness and community through ritual; specific to the tribe on Flathead Reservation, powwows are a community ritual that bring together families and community. Educators worked with families and their children to make moccasins, ribbon shirts and dresses, and shawls prior to the powwow, and included elements of a powwow into their classroom. For example, they keep a drum in the classroom to use for drumming, singing, and dancing.
 Importance of family values and beliefs; educators give the opportunity to parent's to be involved in the day-to-day activities in and around the classroom. Such as, meal times, play time, holidays, and celebrations. Educators collaborate with parents regarding curriculum around holidays and cultural celebrations, reinforced importance of speaking their tribal languages, and clarified with parents what their home language is, and had respectful discussions around traditional values and beliefs that led to compromise, not isolation or separation.

The educators in this study worked on a daily basis to respect, plan, and learn about parent beliefs and values so they can create a community culture linked to school curriculum.

Similar to the previous study mentioned, Vaughn (2016) conducted a multiple case study of four Native American teachers and two European American teachers at Lakeland Elementary. The participants were asked to draw from influences, relationships, and resources of the local tribe, local and state practices, and knowledge of effective pedagogies to co-construct knowledge.

At the time this study was conducted, Lakeland Elementary was failing to meet No Child Left Behind's yearly progress in reading. State officials would come to observe teachers, unannounced, to make sure they were teaching the mandated literacy curriculum. This required the teachers to follow the literacy program, even though the curriculum seldom met the individual and specific linguistic and cultural needs of the majority of Native American students at the school.

So the researcher focused on two questions. The first one being, “In what ways did these teachers approach developing a curriculum to support their students’ social, cultural, and linguistic needs?” One theme that came up was “pedagogical re-envisioning”, which are pedagogies and understandings of culturally responsive teaching to address writing and understand that each student has individual needs. With understanding this, teachers are able to give students the opportunity to include oral storytelling so students have their own personal twist on their learning. The second question was “What shifts in teachers’ pedagogical practices resulted from this collaboration?" Four themes came up; cultural resources, working with community, multimodal approaches, and integrating students’ experiences and interests from their lives outside of school into the curriculum. By addressing these four themes, teachers were able to re-envision how curriculum can meet individual needs for many Native American students without leaving out their interests, culture, or resources.

Holistic approach to learning

Holistic education focuses on the "whole picture" and how concepts and ideas are interrelated, then analyzes and makes meaning of certain ideas.  This form of education is beneficial for all students, especially Indigenous students.  Traditionally, Indigenous forms of learning were/are holistic in nature, focusing on interconnections with context (especially culture, nature, and experiences).

According to a study by Stevenson et al. (2014), challenges that arise with using technology consistently can stem from a weak relationship between spending time outdoors and environmental knowledge and behavior in middle school aged students in North Carolina. This weak relationship may be due to a change in relationship between children and nature. Instead of children having a natural interaction with nature, outdoor activities are based on organized sport or technology.
Inclusion of Arts education constitutes a big part of student learning, it's an activity-based experiential subject

Middle school aged Native American students reported higher levels of environmental behavior than Caucasian students, urging environmental education professionals to continue to close achievement gaps in classrooms. Environmental education professionals continue to ensure that the same factors creating inequity don't affect environmental knowledge. Along with creating a classroom that strives to include environmental knowledge, promoting outdoor activities, and direct interaction with nature gives a chance for Native American students to voice their knowledge to the teacher, and to their peers.

Another form of holistic approach to learning includes parental and community advocacy. As reported by Pedro (2015), parents of students expressed concern that the high school their children attended neglected their children's voices, knowledge, and perspectives in the school. The school districts diversity specialist sought advice to construct a curriculum that would validate, teach, and support the perspective of Native American peoples of the Southwest United States. This team constructed a curriculum based on three ideas; (1) Native American students are harmed when their curriculum is void of knowledge that reflect their identity, culture, and heritage, (2) students who are not Native American are harmed as they learn about narrowed and historicized depictions of Indigenous peoples of the United States, and (3) teaching knowledge from a variety of perspectives should be fundamental to any learning environment.

Pedro suggested, with the foundation of parents’ values, that students are able to engage in conversation, in their mind, through critical dialogic listening in silence. Just because students weren't engaging verbally in the discussion, didn't mean students weren't receptive to the points being made by other students who were verbally engaged. Students can share their beliefs and identities through meta-conversations in connection with the voiced realities between other students. After hearing different sides of other students’ stories, they were able to construct their own identities and understandings into the debate, silently.

To validate the silence, the teacher in this instance, writes down quotes and questions students had asked in small and whole group conversations. At the end of each unit, the teacher would use these quotes and questions to ask students to reflect upon their writings, using notes they took and readings/handouts given to them. Through this option, students were able to contribute their identities, knowledge, and understandings into the classroom space. This process was called Literacy Events, in which students were given the opportunity to absorb and make sense of different perspectives and ideas from verbal discussions in class and readings. Silence helped the students relate internally, and through writing, their perspectives became known. Essentially, in the end, their stories were in their minds and contributing to the conversation as they chose whose ideas to accept and reject or a combination of both. Parents advocated for their children, so next time a student chooses silence, it might not mean that they are disengaged or uninterested. Instead, give them another avenue to express their thoughts.

Indigenous American ways of learning
Indigenous education involves oral traditions (such as listening, watching, imitating), group work, apprenticeship, and high levels of cultural context.  Additionally, knowledge to Indigenous people is sacred, centers on the idea that each student constructs knowledge individually, and is rooted in experience and culture.  Learning is believed to be life-long and involves a unique sense of self-identity and passion, as well as focuses on the importance of community survival and contributions to life and community sustainability. The Indigenous ways of learning occur when diverse perspectives are interconnected through spiritual, holistic, experiential and transformative methods.  The optimal learning environment for Indigenous students incorporates: the land (and traditional skills), Indigenous languages, traditions, cultures, people (self, family, elders, and community), and spirituality.

Active participation
In many Indigenous communities of the Americas, children often begin to learn through their eagerness to be active participants in their communities. Through this, children feel incorporated as valued members when given the opportunity to contribute to everyday social and cultural activities . For example, in a traditional village in Yucatán, Mexico, great importance is placed on engaging in mature activities to help children learn how to participate and contribute appropriately. Adults rarely force children to contribute; rather, they provide children with a great range of independence in deciding what to do with their time. Therefore, children are likely to demonstrate that they want to be a productive member of the community because they have been a part of a social, collaborative culture that views everyday work as something that everyone can partake and help in. 
 
A main model of learning is to incorporate children in various activities where they are expected to be active contributors. The different forms of activities can vary from momentary interactions to broad societal foundations and how those complement their community's traditions. In Maya Belize culture, girls as young as four can work alongside their mothers when washing clothes in the river – rather than being given verbal instructions, they observe keenly, imitate to the best of their ability, and understand that their inclusion is crucial to the community. Rather than being separated and directed away from the mature work and the Indigenous heritage, children are expected to observe and pitch in. 
 
Indigenous communities in the Americas emphasize the ability for community members of all ages to be able to collaborate. In this kind of environment, children learn not only how to participate alongside others, but are also likely to demonstrate an eagerness to contribute as a part of their community. Integration of younger and older children provides the opportunity for different levels of observation, listening, and participation to occur [Rogoff et al. (2010)]. By encouraging child immersion in activities rather than specifically asking for their participation, children have the freedom to construct their own knowledge with self-motivation to continue cultural practices alongside others .
 
Children in many Indigenous cultures of the Americas actively participate and contribute to their community and family activities by observing and pitching in (link to LOPI page ) while informally learning to socialize and gaining a sense of responsibility amongst other skills. A mother reported that being an active participant in everyday activities provides children with the opportunity to gain direction in learning and working that other environments may not provide. For instance, 15-year-old Josefina and her family own a small restaurant in an Indigenous community in Nocutzepo, Mexico where the entire family collaborates to ensure the restaurant functions smoothly. This includes everyone from the grandmother who tends to the fire for cooking to 5-year-old Julia who contributes by carrying the pieces of firewood. Josefina is one of the seven family members that pitches in towards the family food stand. Through observation and listening, she learned that the food stand was the family's main source of income. Overtime, Josefina took it upon herself to pitch in and take over the food stand, thus learning responsibility, cooperation, and commitment. Nobody instructed or demanded her to help with the family business, but she learned the community's expectations and way of living. The inclusive and welcoming environment of the marketplace setting encourages children to participate in everyday social practices and take initiative to learn about their culture, facilitating communal collaboration.

Motivation
In Indigenous American communities, the inclusion of children in communal activities motivates them to engage with their social world, helping them to develop a sense of belonging. Active participation involves children undertaking initiative and acting autonomously.
Similarly, Learning by Observing and Pitching In (LOPI) supports informal learning which generates self-sovereignty. The combination of children's inclusion, development of independence, and initiative for contribution are common elements identified in Indigenous American ways of learning.

Education in Indigenous communities is primarily based on joint engagement in which children are motivated to "pitch-in" in collective activities through developing solidarity within family, resulting in reciprocal bonds. Learning is viewed as an act of meaningful and productive work, not as a separate activity. When asked to self-report about their individual contributions, Indigenous Mexican heritage children placed emphasis on the community rather than on individual role. Their contributions emphasized collaboration and mutual responsibility within the community. A study was conducted with children who had immigrated from Indigenous communities in rural Mexico. The children were less likely to view activities that Westernized culture regarded as "chores" to be a type of work. These children felt that activities such as taking care of siblings, cooking, and assisting in cleaning were activities that help the family. When asked how they viewed participation in household work, children from two Mexican cities reported they contribute because it is a shared responsibility of everyone in the family. They further reported that they want to pitch in to the work because helping and contributing allows them to be more integrated in ongoing family and community activities.  Many Mexican-heritage children also reported being proud of their contributions, while their families reported the contributions of children are valued by everyone involved.

Learning through collaborative work is often correlated with children learning responsibility. Many children in Indigenous Yucatec families often attempt and are expected to help around their homes with household endeavors. It is common to see children offer their help of their own accord, such as Mari, an 18-month-old child from an Indigenous family who watched her mother clean the furniture with a designated cleaning leaf. Mari then took it upon herself to pick a leaf from a nearby bush and attempt to scrub the furniture as well. Although Mari was not using the proper type of leaf, by attempting to assist in cleaning the furniture, she demonstrated that she wanted to help in a household activity. Mari's mother supported and encouraged Mari's participation by creating an environment where she is able to pitch in, even if not in a completely accurate manner. Parents often offer guidance and support in Indigenous American cultures when the child needs it—as they believe this encourages children to be self-motivated and responsible.

Children from Indigenous communities of the Americas are likely to pitch in and collaborate freely without being asked or instructed to do so. For example, P'urepecha children whose mothers followed more traditional Indigenous ways of living demonstrated significantly more independent collaboration when playing Chinese checkers than middle-class children whose mothers had less involvement in Indigenous practices of the Americas. Similarly, when mothers from the Mayan community of San Pedro were instructed to construct a 3-D jigsaw puzzle with their children, mothers who practiced traditional Indigenous culture showed more cooperative engagements with their children than mothers with less traditional practices. These studies exemplify the idea that children from families that practice traditional Indigenous American cultures are likely to exhibit a motivation to collaborate without instruction. Therefore, being in an environment where collaboration is emphasized, serves as an example for children in Indigenous American communities to pitch in out of their own self-motivation and eagerness to contribute.

Assessment
In many Indigenous communities of the Americas children rely on assessment to master a task. Assessment can include the evaluation of oneself as well as evaluation from external influences like parents, family members, or community members. Assessment involves feedback given to learners from their support; this can be through acceptance, appreciation or correction. The purpose of assessment is to assist the learner as they actively participate in their activity. While contributing in the activity, children are constantly evaluating their learning progress based on the feedback of their support. With this feedback, children modify their behavior in mastering their task.

In the Mexican Indigenous heritage community of Nocutzepo, there is available feedback to a learner by observing the results of their contribution and by observing if their support accepted or corrected them. For example, a 5-year-old girl shapes and cooks tortillas with her mother, when the girl would make irregular tortilla shapes her mother would focus her daughter's attention to an aspect of her own shaping. By doing this, the young girl would imitate her mother's movements and improve her own skills. Feedback given by the mother helped the young girl evaluate her own work and correct it.

In traditional Chippewa culture, assessment and feedback are offered in variety of ways. Generally, Chippewa children are not given much praise for their contributions. On occasion, the parents offer assessment through rewards given to the child. These rewards are given as feedback for work well done, and come in the form of a toy carved out of wood, a doll of grass, or maple sugar. When children do not meet expectations, and fail in their contributions, Chippewa parents make sure not to use ridicule as a means of assessment. The Chippewa also recognize the harmful effects of excessive scolding to a child's learning process. Chippewa parents believes that scolding a child too much would "make them worse", and holds back the child's ability to learn. 

For the Chillihuani community in Peru, parents bring up children in a manner that allows them to grow maturely with values like responsibility and respect. These values ultimately influence how children learn in this community. Parents from the Chillihuani community offer assessment of their children through praise, even if the child's contribution is not perfect. Additionally, feedback can come in the form of responsibility given for a difficult task, with less supervision. This responsibility is an important aspect of the learning process for children in Chillihuani because it allows them advance their skills. At only five years old, children are expected to herd sheep, alpaca and llamas with the assistance of an older sibling or adult relative.  By age 8, children take on the responsibility of herding alone even in unfavorable weather conditions. Children are evaluated in terms of their ability to handle difficult tasks and then complemented on a job well done by their parents. This supports the learning development of the child's skills, and encourages their continued contributions.

Criticisms of the Western educational model
Omitting indigenous knowledge amounts to cultural assimilation. The government stigmatizes indigenous learning, culture, and language to assimilate indigenous peoples and create a more homogenized country. A study on Malaysian post secondary students found that indigenous children struggled with social and academic adaptation as well as self-esteem. The study also found that indigenous students had much more difficulty transitioning to university and other new programs compared to non-indigenous students. These challenges are rooted in the fact that indigenous students are underrepresented in higher education and face psychological challenges, such as self-esteem.

Globally, there is a large gap in educational attainment between indigenous and non-indigenous people. A study in Canada found that this gap is widened by the residential school system and traditionally Eurocentric curriculum and teaching methods. Stemming from the negative psychological impacts of attending residential schools in 1883, which were heavily influenced by Christian missionaries and European ideals and customs, a feeling of distrust towards Canadian schools has been passed down through generations. As a result of experiencing racism, neglect, and forced assimilation, the cycle of distrust has pervaded children and grandchildren, and so on. There is a continued lack of teaching of indigenous knowledge, perspective, and history.

As mentioned above, there has been a modern-day global shift towards recognizing the importance of Indigenous education. One reason for this current awareness is the rapid spread of Western educational models throughout the world. Critics of the Western educational model believe that due to colonial histories and lingering cultural ethnocentrism, the Western model can not substitute for an Indigenous education. Throughout history, Indigenous Peoples have experienced, and continue many negative interactions Western society (for example, the Canadian Residential School System), which has led to the oppression and marginalization of Indigenous people.  The film "Schooling the World: The White Man's Last Burden" addresses this issue of modern education and its destruction of unique, Indigenous cultures and individuals' identities. Shot in the Buddhist culture of Ladakh in the northern Indian Himalayas, the film fuses the voices of the Ladakhi people and commentary from an anthropologist/ethnobotanist, a National Geographical Explorer-in-Residence, and an architect of education programs. In essence, the film examines the definitions of wealth and poverty, in other words, knowledge and ignorance. Furthermore, it reveals the effects of trying to institute a global education system or central learning authority, which can ultimately demolish "traditional sustainable agricultural and ecological knowledge, in the breakup of extended families and communities, and in the devaluation of ancient spiritual traditions." Finally, the film promotes a deeper dialogue between cultures, suggesting that there is no single way to learn. No two human beings are alike because they develop under different circumstances, learning, and education.

The director and editor of the film Carol Black writes, "One of the most profound changes that occurs when modern schooling is introduced into traditional societies around the world is a radical shift in the locus of power and control over learning from children, families, and communities to ever more centralized systems of authority." Black continues by explaining that in many non-modernized societies, children learn in a variety of ways, including free play or interaction with multiple children, immersion in nature, and directly helping adults with work and communal activities. "They learn by experience, experimentation, trial and error, by independent observation of nature and human behavior, and through voluntary community sharing of information, story, song, and ritual." Most importantly, local elders and traditional knowledge systems are autonomous in comparison to a strict Western education model. Adults have little control over children's "moment-to-moment movements and choices." Once learning is institutionalized, both the freedom of the individual and his/her respect for the elder's wisdom are ruined. "Family and community are sidelined…The teacher has control over the child, the school district has control over the teacher, the state has control over the district, and increasingly, systems of national standards and funding create national control over states." When Indigenous knowledge is seen as inferior to a standard school curriculum, an emphasis is placed on an individual's success in a broader consumer culture instead of on an ability to survive in his/her own environment. Black concludes with a comment, "We assume that this central authority, because it is associated with something that seems like an unequivocal good – 'education' – must itself be fundamentally good, a sort of benevolent dictatorship of the intellect." From a Western perspective, centralized control over learning is natural and consistent with the principles of freedom and democracy; and yet, it is this same centralized system or method of discipline that does not take into account the individual, which in the end stamps out local cultures.

Colonialism & Western methods of learning
The education system in the Americas reinforces western cultures, prior knowledge and learning experiences which leads to the marginalization and oppression of various other cultures.  Teaching students primarily through European perspectives results in non-European students believing that their cultures have not contributed to the knowledge of societies. Often, Indigenous students resist learning because they do not want to be oppressed or labeled as 'incapable of learning' due to neo-colonial knowledge and teaching. The act of Decolonization would greatly benefit Indigenous students and other marginalized students because it involves the deconstruction of engagement with the values, beliefs and habits of Europeans.

Pedagogical approaches to Indigenous education 
Decentralization requires a shift in education that steps away from Western practices. The following are pedagogical approaches aimed at empowering Indigenous students and Indigenous communities through education that does not rely on western culture.

Culturally relevant pedagogy 
Culturally relevant pedagogy involves curriculum tailored to the cultural needs of students and participants involved. Culture is at the core of CRP and teachers and educators aim for all students to achieve academic success, develop cultural competence, and develop critical consciousness to challenge the current social structures of inequality that affect Indigenous communities in particular. Culturally relevant pedagogy also extends to culturally sustaining and revitalizing pedagogy which actively works to challenge power relations and colonization by reclaiming, through education, what has been displaced by colonization and recognizing the importance of community engagement in such efforts.

Critical Indigenous pedagogy 
Critical Indigenous pedagogy focuses on resisting colonization and oppression through education practices that privilege Indigenous knowledge and promote Indigenous sovereignty. Beyond schooling and instruction, CIP is rooted in thinking critically about social injustices and challenging those through education systems that empower youth and teachers to create social change. The goal of teachers and educators under CIP is to guide Indigenous students in developing critical consciousness by creating a space for self-reflection and dialogue as opposed to mere instruction. This form of pedagogy empowers Indigenous youth to take charge and responsibility to transform their own communities.

Under critical Indigenous pedagogy, schools are considered sacred landscapes since they offer a sacred place for growth and engagement. Western-style schooling is limited in engaging Indigenous knowledge and languages but schools that embrace critical Indigenous pedagogy recognize Indigenous knowledge and epistemologies which is why Indigenous schools should be considered sacred landscape.

Land-based pedagogy 
Land as pedagogy recognizes colonization as dispossession and thus aims to achieve decolonization through education practices that connect Indigenous people to their native land and the social relations that arise from those lands. Land-based pedagogy encourages Indigenous people to center love for the land and each other as the core of education in order to contest oppression and colonialism that is aimed at deterring Indigenous people from their land.

Land-based pedagogy has no specific curriculum because education and knowledge come from what the land gives. Unlike western practices with a standard curriculum, land-based pedagogy is based on the idea of abstaining from imposing an agenda to another living being. Intelligence is considered a consensual engagement where children consent to learning and having a set curriculum is thought to normalize dominance and non-consent within schooling and inevitably extended to societal norms. Western style education is seen as coercive because in order to achieve something, one must follow the set guidelines and curriculum enforced by educators. Individuals show interest and commitment on their own thus achieving self-actualization and sharing their knowledge with others through modeling and “wearing their teachings.” The values of land-based pedagogy are important to Indigenous people groups who believe that “raising Indigenous children in a context where their consent, physically and intellectually, is not just required but valued, goes a long way to undoing the replication of colonial gender violence” (Simpson, 31)

Community-based pedagogy 
Community-based education is central to the revival of Indigenous cultures and diverse languages. This form of pedagogy allows community members to participate and influence the learning environment in local schools. Community-based education embraces the ideas of Paolo Freirie who called for individuals to “become active participants in shaping their own education” (May, 10).

The main effects of instilling community-based pedagogy in schools are as follows:
 Parent involvement in decision making encourages children to become closer to their teachers
 Indigenous parents themselves gain confidence and positively impacts their children's learning
 Teacher-parent collaboration eliminates stereotypes non-Indigenous teachers may have about Indigenous people.
 Communities collectively gain self-respect and achieve political influence as they take responsibility for their local schools

The school environment under a community-based education system requires communication and collaboration between the school and the community. The community must share leadership within the schools and must be involved in decision-making, planning, and implementation. Children learn through the guidance rather than determinants of their teachers or elders and are taught skills of active participation. Out of community-based education arises community-based participatory research (CBPR), an approach to research that facilitates co-learning co-partnership between researchers and community members to promote community-capacity building.  CBPR requires having youth-researcher partnerships, youth action-groups, and local committees made up of youth, tribal leaders, and elders. This approach to research builds strength and empowers community members.

Culturally sustaining and revitalizing pedagogy 
McCarty and Lee (2014) express that tribal sovereignty (Indigenous people's as peoples, not populations or national minorities), must include education sovereignty. The authors report that Culturally Sustaining and Revitalizing Pedagogy (CSRP) is necessary in education, based on three items; (1) asymmetrical power relations and the goal of transforming legacies of colonization, (2) reclaim and revitalize what has been disrupted and displaced by colonization, and (3) the need for community-based accountability.

CSRP is meant to off balance dominant policy dialogue. This research follows two case studies at two different schools, one in Arizona and one in New Mexico. Tiffany Lee reports for Native American Community Academy (NACA) in Albuquerque, New Mexico. The core values for the school include; respect, responsibility, community service, culture, perseverance, and reflection. These core values reflect tribal communities as well. NACA offers three languages; Navajo, Lakota, and Tiwa, and the school also seeks outside resources to teach local languages. This study emphasizes that teaching language is culturally sustaining and revitalizing; which creates a sense of belonging and strengthens cultural identities, pride, and knowledge. At NACA, teachers know they possess inherent power as Indigenous education practitioners. They make a difference in revitalizing Native languages through culturally sustaining practices. The second case study was reported by Teresa McCarty at Puente de Hozho (PdH), that language has a different role for members of various cultural communities. At PdH, the educators reflect parents’ influence (Dine and Latino/a) for culturally sustaining and revitalizing education. The goal is to heal forced linguistic wounds and convey important cultural and linguistic knowledge that connects to the school's curriculum and pedagogy.

Balancing academic, linguistic, and cultural interests is based on accountability to Indigenous communities. The authors describe the need for linguistic teachings as a “fight for plurilingual and pluricultural education.”  Educators can attempt to balance state and federal requirements with local communities and Indigenous nations.

Language revitalization efforts 
Many Native American and Indigenous communities in the United States are working to revitalize their Indigenous languages. These language revitalization efforts often take place in schools, via language immersion programs. In Guatemala, teachers have had a sense of agency to teach students' the Indigenous language as well as about Indigenous culture in order to prevent language loss and maintain cultural identity.

Importance 
Researchers have brought up the importance of language revitalization efforts to preserve Native culture. The extinction of Native languages has been brought up as one of the reasons that revitalization efforts are necessary and McCarty, Romero, and Zepeda have noted that  “84% of all Indigenous languages in the United States and Canada have no new speakers to pass them on." Native language is seen as a path to preserving Native heritage such as “knowledge of medicine, religion, cultural practices and traditions, music, art, human relationships and child-rearing practices, as well as Indigenous ways of knowing about the sciences, history, astronomy, psychology, philosophy, and anthropology.” “Duane Mistaken Chief, a member of the Blackfeet tribe, explains that American Indians use words and phrases to reconstruct their cultures and to heal themselves. By studying the Indian words, they learn to respect themselves. From the Indian point of view, the traditional language is a sacred gift, the symbol of one’s identity, the embodiment of one’s culture and traditions, a means for expressing inner thoughts and feelings, and the source of ancestral wisdom." Additionally, linguists and community members believe in the importance of revitalizing Native languages because “it is at once a direction for research, action, and documentation." Finally, it has been suggested that it is especially important to recognize Native languages in school settings because this leads to teachers recognizing the people, which leads to self-esteem and academic success for the students.

School Based Language-Immersion Models 
Aguilera and LeCompte (2007) compared case studies of three different language-immersion programs in schools in Alaska, Hawaii, and the Navajo Nation. They examined evidence from prior research studies, examined descriptive documents from the study participants, conducted phone interviews and email exchanges with executive directors and school district administrators, and utilized other research on language-immersion models. In addition to qualitative evidence, they analyzed quantitative data such as school test scores and demographic.

Through their comparison of test data, Aguilera and LeCompte found that there was an increase in performance on state benchmark exam scores by the Ayaprun- and Dine’- immersion students. On the flip side, there was lower performance in these schools on the norm-referenced tests. However, the researchers note that these tests are often biased, negatively impacting Indigenous students. Ultimately, the researchers did not find that one immersion model had a higher academic achievement impact on Native students than the other studies. However, they “agree with language experts that total immersion is a more effective approach to achieving proficiency in a Native language."

Through their study, Aguilera and LeCompte (2007) examined the language nest and two-way immersion models. Another researcher, Lee (2007), examined “compartmentalizing” through both quantitative and qualitative measures. Quantitatively, Lee examined language levels, language usage, and lifespan experiences of Navajo students. Qualitatively, Lee interviewed Navajo students to learn more about their feelings and opinions on learning the Navajo language. Below are descriptions of the three school models used in the studies by Aguilera, LeCompte, and Lee.

 Language nest – This model is used by the Native Hawaiian Aha Punana Leo consortium and begins in preschools. “In the language nest preschools, the Indigenous language is considered the student’s first language, and children converse and study in that language, every day and all day." These students are taught in English only after they are literate in their Indigenous language.
 Two-Way Language-Immersion Model – In this model, maintenance of the Native language is promoted, while students also learn a second language. This model typically lasts from five to seven years. One form of a two-way language immersion model is the 50-50 model, in which students use English half of the class time and the target Native language the other half of the class time. The other model is a 90-10 model, in which students use the target Native language 90% of the time beginning in kindergarten. These students then increase the use of English “by 10% annually until both languages are used equally—a 50-50 split by fourth grade.”
 Compartmentalizing— Schools that do not have full immersion programs often use compartmentalizing. Compartmentalizing refers to the Indigenous language being taught as a separate topic of study as opposed to having students instructed in the Native language for their academic content areas. According to Lee (2007), compartmentalizing is the most common approach for teaching Navajo language in schools today.

Through her study, Lee (2007) concluded that “Navajo-language use in the home was the strongest influence over the students’ current Navajo-language level and Navajo-language use." She noted that “schools need to become more proactive in language revitalization” and shared that she found the compartmentalizing language-immersion programs in her study “modest” and “the language was mostly taught as though all the students were monolingual English speakers." Ultimately, the researcher asserts that in order for language-immersion programs to be done well, schools need to invest in more resources, improved teaching pedagogy, and the development of students’ critical thinking and critical consciousness skills."

Difficulties of Implementation 
Despite much interest in language revitalization efforts in Native communities, it can be challenging when it comes to program implementation. Research suggests several factors in the United States that make it difficult to implement language immersion programs in schools.

Aguilera and LeCompte (2007) found the following difficulties in their study:

 An “overwhelming pressure to teach English, especially due to the “recent emphasis on high-stakes testing in English"
 “Lack of importance given to cultural aspects of language by non-native educators and policymakers”
 Lack of family participation, due to parents’ fears that their children will not learn English or be successful if they participate in an immersion program
 Securing long term funding to sustain programs

Other studies found additional difficulties in implementation:

 Hostile Policies: McCarty and Nicholas (2014) conducted qualitative research on language revitalization efforts for the Mohawk, Navajo, Hawaiian, and Hopi people and found one difficulty in implementation was hostile policies toward bi/multilingual education efforts.
 Scarcity of Indigenous Staff and Resources: Mary Hermes opened Waadookodaading, a language immersion school centered around the Ojibwe language. The school is located near a reservation of about 3,000 enrolled members, but as of 2007, there were only approximately 10 fluent speakers. Because of massive language loss among Indigenous groups, it can be difficult to find fluent native speakers. It is necessary to have high language proficiency in order to teach in an immersion school. Not only do immersion teachers need to be fluent in the language, but they also need to be skilled in pedagogy which presents additional challenges. Requirements from the NCLB state that paraprofessionals need to have at least an associate degree, and those working in the primary grades to have early childhood education coursework. Oftentimes, the people who would serve in these positions in language immersion schools are elders, and they do not have these requirements. Additionally, a lack of materials in Indigenous languages results in a demand on educators to produce the materials along the way.
 Conflicting Perspectives: Ngai (2008) conducted qualitative research on Salish language revitalization efforts by speaking with 89 participants through 101 interviews in three different school districts on the Flathead Indian Reservation. His goal through his research was to produce a framework that could be used for Native language education in districts that had a mix of Native and non-Native students. Ngai found that, “Language revitalization is particularly challenging in school districts with a mix of AI/AN and non-Native populations because of the co-existence of diverse and often conflicting perspectives."

Helpful Factors in Implementation 
Despite the challenges of creating and maintaining immersion programs, there are many schools in existence today. Researchers suggest the following factors as helpful in leading to implementation of immersion models.

 Leadership and community activism – Aguilera and LeCompte (2007) noted in their study that having Indigenous leaders who are invested in implementing these models is critical. In another study, Ngai (2008) notes that, “In public schools, the continuation of Salish language instruction since the 1970s can be attributed to the efforts of Salish-language teachers who are willing to step into a traditionally hostile setting in order to pass the language on to the young.”
 School Autonomy – Many schools have applied for charter status in order to protect language-immersion schools from being closed by school members who object to the programs. Charter status also allows schools the flexibility to gain more funding.
 Partnerships with higher education systems—In order to implement a language immersion model, schools must have trained teachers. Several of the communities where language immersion models have been successful are, “situated in communities where there is access to higher education degree programs, and some of these postsecondary institutions offer Native language classes."

Benefits
For Indigenous learners and instructors, the inclusion of these methods into schools often enhances educational effectiveness by providing an education that adheres to an Indigenous person's own inherent perspectives, experiences, language, and customs, thereby making it easier for children to transition into the realm of adulthood. For non-Indigenous students and teachers, such an education often has the effect of raising awareness of individual and collective traditions surrounding Indigenous communities and peoples, thereby promoting greater respect for and appreciation of various cultural realities.

In terms of educational content, the inclusion of Indigenous knowledge within curricula, instructional materials, and textbooks has largely the same effect on preparing students for the greater world as other educational systems, such as the Western model.

There is value in including Indigenous knowledge and education in the public school system.  Students of all backgrounds can benefit from being exposed to Indigenous education, as it can contribute to reducing racism in the classroom and increase the sense of community in a diverse group of students.  There are a number of sensitive issues about what can be taught (and by whom) that require responsible consideration by non-Indigenous teachers who appreciate the importance of interjecting Indigenous perspectives into standard mainstream schools. Concerns about misappropriation of Indigenous ways of knowing without recognizing the plight of Indigenous Peoples and "giving back" to them are legitimate. Since most educators are non-Indigenous, and because Indigenous perspectives may offer solutions for current and future social and ecological problems, it is important to refer to Indigenous educators and agencies to develop curriculum and teaching strategies while at the same time encouraging activism on behalf of Indigenous Peoples. One way to bring authentic Indigenous experiences into the classroom is to work with community elders. They can help facilitate the incorporation of authentic knowledge and experiences into the classroom. Teachers must not shy away from bringing controversial subjects into the classroom. The history of Indigenous people should be delved into and developed fully.  There are many age appropriate ways to do this, including the use of children's literature, media, and discussion.  Individuals are recommended to reflect regularly on their teaching practice to become aware of areas of instruction in need of Indigenous perspectives.

21st century skills
Incorporating Indigenous ways of learning into educational practices has potential to benefit both Indigenous and non-Indigenous learners.  The 21st century skills needed in modern curriculum include: collaboration, creativity, innovation, problem-solving, inquiry, multicultural literacy, etc. Indigenous ways of learning incorporate all these skills through experiential and holistic methods.  Additionally, aboriginal education styles align with 21st century skills though involving teachers and students as co-constructors of education, and by valuing the interconectidness of content and context.

Educational gap
Some Indigenous people view education as an important tool to improve their situation by pursuing economic, social and cultural development; it provides them with individual empowerment and self-determination. Education is also a means for employment; it is a way for socially marginalized people to raise themselves out of poverty. However, some education systems and curricula lack knowledge about Indigenous peoples ways of learning, causing an educational gap for Indigenous people. Factors for the education gap include lower school enrollments, poor school performance, low literacy rates, and higher dropout rates. Some schools teach Indigenous children to be "socialized" and to be a national asset to society by assimilating, "Schooling has been explicitly and implicitly a site of rejection of Indigenous knowledge and language, it has been used as a means of assimilating and integrating Indigenous peoples into a 'national' society and identity at the cost of their Indigenous identity and social practices". Intercultural learning is an example of how to build a bridge for the educational gap.

Other factors that contribute to the education gap in Indigenous cultures are socioeconomic disadvantage, which includes access to healthcare, employment, incarceration rates, and housing. According to the Australian Government Department of the Prime Minister and Cabinet in their 2015 Closing the Gap Report, the country was not on track to halve the gap in reading, writing and numeracy achievements for Indigenous Australian students. The government reported that there had been no overall improvement in Indigenous reading and numeracy since 2008.

Importance
Indigenous knowledge is particularly important to modern environmental management in today's world. Environmental and land management strategies traditionally used by Indigenous peoples have continued relevance. Indigenous cultures usually live in a particular bioregion for many generations and have learned how to live there sustainably. In modern times, this ability often puts truly Indigenous cultures in a unique position of understanding the interrelationships, needs, resources, and dangers of their bioregion. This is not true of Indigenous cultures that have been eroded through colonialism or genocide or that have been displaced.

The promotion of Indigenous methods of education and the inclusion of traditional knowledge also enables those in Western and post-colonial societies to re-evaluate the inherent hierarchy of knowledge systems. Indigenous knowledge systems were historically denigrated by Western educators; however, there is a current shift towards recognizing the value of these traditions. The inclusion of aspects of Indigenous education requires us to acknowledge the existence of multiple forms of knowledge rather than one, standard, benchmark system.

A prime example of how Indigenous methods and content can be used to promote the above outcomes is demonstrated within higher education in Canada. Due to certain jurisdictions' focus on enhancing academic success for Aboriginal learners and promoting the values of multiculturalism in society, the inclusion of Indigenous methods and content in education is often seen as an important obligation and duty of both governmental and educational authorities.

Many scholars in the field assert that Indigenous education and knowledge has a "transformative power" for Indigenous communities that can be used to foster "empowerment and justice." The shift to recognizing Indigenous models of education as legitimate forms is therefore important in the ongoing effort for Indigenous rights, on a global scale.

Implications for teachers
Educators need to foster a respectful learning environment that promotes confidence and openness as well as an authentic dialogue to help students come to understand content through spirituality and cultural infusion. It is also important for educators to realize that time is crucial for students to connect intellect, spirituality and their understanding of the physical world. Many educators have stated that educational programs do not prepare them with enough support and materials for effectively teaching Indigenous students. Therefore, it is important for educators to seek out ongoing teach development programs directed toward improving teaching so that marginalized groups do not suffer.

Challenges (as seen with the Na)
There are numerous practical challenges to the implementation of Indigenous education. Incorporating Indigenous knowledge into formal Western education models can prove difficult. However, the discourse surrounding Indigenous education and knowledge suggests that integrating Indigenous methods into traditional modes of schooling is an "ongoing process of 'cultural negotiation.'"

Indigenous education often takes different forms than a typical Western model, as the practices of the Na ethnic group of southwest China illustrate. Because Na children learn through example, traditional Na education is less formal than the standard Western model. In contrast to structured hours and a classroom setting, learning takes places throughout the day, both in the home and in adults' workplaces. Based on the belief that children are "fragile, soulless beings", Na education focuses on nurturing children rather than on punishing them. Children develop an understanding of cultural values, such as speech taboos and the "reflection" of individual actions "on the entire household." Playing games teaches children about their natural surroundings and builds physical and mental acuity. Forms of Indigenous knowledge, including weaving, hunting, carpentry, and the use of medicinal plants, are passed on from adult to child in the workplace, where children assist their relatives or serve as apprentices for several years.

However, increasing modernity is a challenge to such modes of instruction. Some types of Indigenous knowledge are dying out because of decreased need for them and a lack of interest from youth, who increasingly leave the village for jobs in the cities. Furthermore, formal Chinese state schooling "interferes with informal traditional learning." Children must travel a distance from their villages to attend state schools, removing them from traditional learning opportunities in the home and workplace. The curriculum in state schools is standardized across China and holds little relevance to the lives of the Na. Na children are required to learn Mandarin Chinese, Chinese and global history, and Han values, as opposed to their native language, local history, and Indigenous values. Methods of instruction rely on rote learning rather than experiential learning, as employed in Na villages.

Several individuals and organizations pay for children's school fees and build new schools in an attempt to increase village children's access to education. Yet such well-intended actions do not affect the schools' curriculum, which means there is no improvement in the sustainability of the children's native cultures. As a result, such actions may actually "be contributing to the demise of the very culture" they are trying to preserve.

Associated organizations
Many organizations work to promote Indigenous methods of education. The United Nations Declaration of the Rights of Indigenous Peoples makes particular reference to the educational rights of Indigenous peoples in Article 14. It emphasizes the responsibility of states to adequately provide access to education for Indigenous people, particularly children, and when possible, for education to take place within their own culture and to be delivered in their own language.

Indigenous peoples have founded and actively run several of these organizations. On a global scale, many of these organizations engage in active knowledge transfer in an effort to protect and promote Indigenous knowledge and education modes. One such organization, the Indigenous Education Institute (IEI), aims to apply Indigenous knowledge and tradition to a contemporary context, with a particular focus on astronomy and other science disciplines. Another such organization is the World Indigenous Nations Higher Education Consortium (WINHEC), which was launched during the World Indigenous Peoples Conference on Education (WIPCE) at Delta Lodge, Kananakis Calgary in Alberta, Canada in August 2002. The founding members were Australia, Hawai'i, Alaska, the American Indian Higher Education Consortium of the United States, Canada, the Wänanga of Aotearoa (New Zealand), and Saamiland (North Norway). The stated aims of WINHEC include the provision of an international forum for Indigenous peoples to pursue common goals through higher education.

See also
Contemporary Native American issues in the United States#Education
Alternative education
 Bilingual education
 Traditional knowledge
 Indigenous language
 Indigenous peoples
 Traditional ecological knowledge
 Declaration on the Rights of Indigenous Peoples
 Traditional knowledge
 Indigenous rights
 Critical pedagogy of place

References